Mindy St. Claire may refer to:

 Mindy St. Claire (The Good Place character)
 "Mindy St. Claire" (The Good Place episode)